A Tortuga cocktail is a non-alcoholic beverage named for the Haitian island Tortuga of northern Hispaniola that was used by pirates as launching ground for piracy activities. It is made with iced tea and brown sugar, garnished with cinnamon and a lime wedge. It is similar to the popular American drink sweet tea.

An unrelated drink of the same name was served by Trader Vic's in the 1930s. It was a variation on the daiquiri, made using overproof Guyanese and Cuban rums and small amounts of curacao, creme de cacao, and sweet vermouth for additional flavor.

References

Non-alcoholic mixed drinks